Touissit is a town in Jerada Province, Oriental, Morocco. According to the 2004 census, it has a population of 3429.

The Touissit-Bou Beker district is the most important Mississippi Valley-Type (MVT) mining district of Northern Africa. Touissit-Bou Beker is well known among mineral collectors for fine specimens of anglesite, cerussite, azurite, vanadinite and other minerals.

References

Municipalities of Morocco
Populated places in Jerada Province